Roccadaspide is a town and comune in the province of Salerno in the Campania region of south-western Italy.

Geography

The town is located in the north-west side of Cilento, not too far from Paestum and in the Calore River Valley.

References

External links

 Official website 

Cities and towns in Campania
Localities of Cilento